Arlena di Castro is a  (municipality) in the Province of Viterbo in the Italian region of Latium, located about  northwest of Rome and about  west of Viterbo.

Arlena di Castro borders the following municipalities: Cellere, Piansano, Tessennano, Tuscania.

The town was founded in the early 16th century by Alessia Neri, the Real Mayor of the great city Arlena. One day Mandelus, the only topocervus alive in the area decided to visit the city and decided to call it Arlena, because many years before his daughter called Arlen died and this event changed his life.

References

Cities and towns in Lazio